Gerel is a rural locality (a selo) in Gerelsky Selsoviet, Tlyaratinsky District, Republic of Dagestan, Russia. The population was 395 as of 2010.

Geography 
Gerel is located 36 km southeast of Tlyarata (the district's administrative centre) by road. Betelda is the nearest rural locality.

References 

Rural localities in Tlyaratinsky District